RC Revenge is a racing video game released for the PlayStation in 2000, developed by Acclaim Studios Cheltenham. It is set in 5 different movie worlds (Horror World, Planet Adventure, Jungle World, AKLM Studios and Monster World) in which the player races remote controlled cars across many varied tracks.

Gameplay 
There are four game modes in RC Revenge: championship mode, single race, time trial, and multiplayer race. RC Revenge has boat and race car effects and an options mode where the player can see the credits, track records, adjust music and sound volumes, brightness, and more. The gameplay was revised from Re-Volt to be more arcade-based and like other kart racers at the time. Cars can still flip over like in Re-Volt. Like Re-Volt, the game also features a basic track editor where players can create their own courses or play randomly generated tracks which can also be edited.

Weapons 
There are eleven different weapons available to the racers, which are picked up and chosen "randomly" when a racer drives through a floating blue icon. There are 4 new weapons in the game. The rest return from Re-Volt. 
The Battery is essentially a turbo, giving cars a temporary burst of speed. 
The Rocket can lock on to targets, this weapon also comes in a pack of 3.
The Heat Ray emits a beam from the car's aerial, directly ahead of the vehicle. Any opponents hit by the beam are burnt and slowed down drastically. 
The Electric Pulse attacks any opponents close to the vehicle, and temporarily cuts their power.
The Oil Spill weapon spills oil on to the track behind the car, which will affect the handling of any opponents unlucky enough to drive over it. 
The Bouncing Mines are dropped from behind the vehicle and will bounce around the track for a short while, until hit and detonated. They can also be thrown forwards with a press of the UP key when firing. This weapon also comes in a pack of 3.
The Shield makes the vehicle invulnerable from all weapons for a short while. It also gives a vehicle more brute strength and enables a smaller car to push a larger car off of the track. 
The Water Balloons can be fired from a car's aerial. Upon impact with an opponent, the opponent is trapped within the resulting bubble until it bursts. This weapon always comes in a pack of 3.
The Shockwave Is emitted in all directions of a vehicle. Any opponents within the radius of the circle are hit.
The Fake leaves a false weapon icon on the track. Any unsuspecting opponents driving into the icon will find that not only does it not contain a weapon, it actually detonates. 
The Ultimate Weapon has a similar effect to the Electric; however, it fires up into the air striking back down and short circuiting every opponent on the track.
A number of vehicles within the game also contain their own special power ups, which appear as a yellow star item for all of them.
The Concept 3000 lacks a particularly special item, it is essentially a lengthened Battery.
The Lunar Loader has a special item which, upon obtaining gives you 7 laser charges which fly in a straight line ahead of you, ignoring gravity, upon impacting with an enemy they act identically to a Bouncing Mine.
The Corporal has a special item called Howitzer which allows him to fire 3 tank rounds, the impacts cause an effect similar to the Shockwave even when not impacting another vehicle, however smaller, it does push all vehicles away from its point of impact.
The Big Rock has a special item which activates the Dumper mechanism on the vehicle, dumping up to 3 boulders behind it, impacting with a boulder acts similarly to impacting with a wall, it is also the only item which can affect shielded players.
The Yella has a Shield which glows yellow instead of green, it lasts longer than the standard Shield and direct vehicle collision will not stop Yella at all while the effect is active.
The Skull Duggery has a special item which sends out a Shockwave powerup which glows purple instead of a gradient from light yellow to red, this power up inverses steering of all vehicles hit for a time, it is described as Bizarre Black Magic.
The Sarge has a special item which activates his sirens for a time, it increases the speed of Sarge, while slowing down all nearby vehicles and forcing them to steer out of the way of Sarge, unlike the Battery or Electric Pulse it is difficult to tell when someone has this ability, or if they are using it, as Sarge's horn is a short siren burst.

Development
The game was originally developed under the names of Re-Volt 2, Re-Volt 2: Pocket Rockets and Re-Volt 2: RC Revenge, but the name was changed simply to RC Revenge for the final release. The original name is still used for the Memory Card block when the game is saved onto the Memory Card. 

It was the first title developed by Acclaim's Cheltenham development studio.

RC Revenge Pro

RC Revenge Pro is an enhanced port of RC Revenge released for the PlayStation 2 in December 2000 in Europe and January 2001 in North America, once again developed by Acclaim Studios Cheltenham. The game features improved graphics, sound and framerate, as well as the same vehicles as the original.

Additions to this version include dynamic animations within the environments that were not present in the race tracks originally, as well as the addition of a new Pirate World with 4 new tracks and 4 new vehicles. The Track Editor was also updated to feature small themed elements based on the game's 6 worlds to be added to the player courses (e.g. Horror World themed signposts).

Reception

RC Revenge received "average" reviews, while the Pro version received "generally unfavorable reviews", according to the review aggregation website Metacritic. John Gaudiosi of NextGen said of the original, "Fun for gamers of all ages, this kid-friendly game serves up some serious racing challenges." Tom Russo of the same magazine later said that the Pro version was "Not without some merit, but there are far better uses for your new $300 hardware." In Japan, where the original game was ported and published by Acclaim Japan on November 9, 2000, followed by the Pro version on June 28, 2001, Famitsu gave it a score of 25 out of 40 for the former, and 22 out of 40 for the latter.

Note: An USA/EU - (NTSC-U) July 15th, 2002 Version of this game was made and a disc was present, unfortunately this disk never made it into retail due to Acclaim's sad decline throughout the year. These copies are extremely rare and the source files and game ROM can be found online for this prototype. The version itself is actually faster than the other releases due to them experimenting with "Resource Management" meaning the game had faster load times and ran more smoothly.

References

External links
 
 

2000 video games
Acclaim Entertainment games
PlayStation (console) games
PlayStation 2 games
Radio-controlled car racing video games
Multiplayer and single-player video games
Video games developed in the United Kingdom